The O'Neill Model J Magnum, also called the Magnum Jake and the Magnum Pickup, is a homebuilt aircraft design for bush flying operations similar to the de Havilland Beaver.

Design and development
O'Neill intended to modify the Aristocraft II six-place homebuilt with a  radial engine. Eventually a clean sheet design was drawn up based on a bush pilot survey in Alaska.

The Magnum is a single-engine, strut-braced, high-wing aircraft with an uncommon dual-main, four-wheel landing gear. The fiberglass gear legs support castoring wheels in the front, allowing for conversion to floats and providing support when the tail section is swung open for cargo loading. The fuselage is constructed from welded steel tubing, with aluminum skin. The engine cowl is sourced from a Cessna UC-78. The wings have full-span flaps, and spoilerons and are designed to fold like those of a Fairchild FB-2C. The fuel tank is mounted under the cockpit and can be released to reduce fire risk during emergency landings.

Post flight-testing modifications resulted in changes to the landing gear layout, spoileron airflow control and engine cooling.

The Magnum was demonstrated at the EAA Airshow in 1984. In 1996, O'Neill folded the O'Neill aircraft company due to low interest and funding for further development. The prototype was sold in 1996 for an intended turboprop conversion.

Variants
Magnum
Model J Magnum
Magnum Jake
Magnum Pickup
Magnum V8 Pickup
The prototype was converted in 1986 from a radial engine to an automobile engine powered by a Ford 351W with a McCulloch VS57 supercharger from a snowmobile, producing  at 4500rpm.

Specifications (Model J Magnum perf estimated)

See also

References

External links
Site with a description of the V-8 engine installation

Homebuilt aircraft